The Battle of Zafar took place in 632 between Khalid ibn al-Walid - a companion of the Islamic prophet, Muhammad - and a tribal chieftess called Salma. Khalid defeated her and she died on the battlefield. The battle was part of the Ridda Wars. 

The apostate leader was riding on a camel, surrounded by her loyal bodyguards. 

In third week of October 632 CE Khalid ibn al-Walid approached her with a group of mujaheddin and slaughtered her and her bodyguards. Several hundred apostates died in this battle.

References

 A.I. Akram, The Sword of Allah: Khalid bin al-Waleed, His Life and Campaigns Lahore, 1969
 A.I. Akram, The Sword of Allah: Khalid bin al-Waleed, His Life and Campaigns, Nat. Publishing. House, Rawalpindi (1970) .

Battles of Khalid ibn Walid
Battles involving the Rashidun Caliphate
630s in the Rashidun Caliphate
632
Ridda Wars